Hyperion is an album by American jazz pianist Marilyn Crispell, German multi-reedist Peter Brötzmann and drummer Hamid Drake, which was recorded live in 1992 during the Toronto Jazz Festival and released on the Music & Arts label. The trio had only played once before, a night earlier on Vancouver.

Reception

In his review for AllMusic, Scott Yanow states "The music often proceeds at a deliberate pace and sometimes utilizes a dramatic use of space, but the playing is consistently intense (particularly Brötzmann's screaming horns) before ending rather inconclusively."

The Penguin Guide to Jazz compares the album with Cascades and says that "The trio with Peter Brötzmann and Hamid Drake is, predictably, more intense and frenetic, though the saxophonist does also have his delicately lyrical side, and he defers at moments during 'Hyperion I' to Crispell's desire to take the music down a more expressive path."

Track listing
All titles are collective improvisations
 "Hyperion I" – 20:22
 "Hyperion II" – 13:36
 "Hyperion III" – 15:21

Personnel
Marilyn Crispell – piano
Peter Brötzmann - saxophones, clarinets, tarogato
Hamid Drake - drums, hand drums

References

1995 live albums
Marilyn Crispell live albums
Peter Brötzmann live albums
Music & Arts live albums
Collaborative albums